Kern National Wildlife Refuge is a  protected area located in the southern portion of California's San Joaquin Valley, 20 miles west of the city of Delano. Situated on the southern margin of what was once the largest freshwater wetland complex in the western United States, Kern National Wildlife Refuge provides an optimum wintering habitat for migratory birds with an emphasis on waterfowl and water birds.

Through restoration and maintenance of native habitat diversity, the refuge also provides suitable habitat for several endangered species as well as preserving a remnant example of the historic valley uplands in the San Joaquin Desert. Approximately 8,200 visitors annually participate in refuge programs ranging from waterfowl hunting to wildlife viewing.

References

External links 
Refuge profile
Refuge website

National Wildlife Refuges in California
Protected areas of Kern County, California
Wetlands of California
Landforms of Kern County, California